For other uses: Antotohazo (disambiguation)

Antotohazo  is a town in Analamanga Region, in the  Central Highlands of Madagascar, located north-west from the capital of Antananarivo. It has a population of 4,390 in 2018.

References

Populated places in Analamanga